Apiin is a natural flavonoid, a diglycoside of the flavone apigenin found in the winter-hardy plants parsley and celery, and in banana leaf. The glycoside moiety at carbon-7 of apigenin, O-β-D-apiofuranosyl(→)2-β-D-glucosyl, is carried by several other flavones in parsley plant and seed. The sugar apiose possibly play a role in winter hardiness of celery, duckweed and parsley.

See also 
Apiose

References 

Flavone glycosides